Pelé (Edson Arantes do Nascimento; 1940–2022) was a Brazilian footballer.

Pele or Pelé may also refer to:

Film
 Pele Eterno, 2004 documentary film about the Brazilian football player Pelé
 Pelé: Birth of a Legend, 2016 film about the Brazilian football player Pelé
 Pelé (2021 film), a biographical documentary film about Brazilian footballer Pelé

Music
 Pele (American band)
 Pele (English band)
 Pelé (album), a 1977 soundtrack album by Sérgio Mendes for a documentary about the footballer's life
 "Pelé", a song by Pólo Norte from the album Deixa o Mundo Girar

People
Pele (name), given name, surname and nickname

Pelé (footballer, born 1973), Macanese football midfielder of São Toméan descent
Pelé (footballer, born 1978), Cape Verdean-Portuguese football defender
Pelé (footballer, born 1987), Portuguese football midfielder
Pelé (footballer, born 1991), Portuguese football midfielder of Guinea-Bissau descent

Science and geography
Pele, the Hungarian name for Becheni village, Săuca Commune, Satu Mare County, Romania
2202 Pele, an asteroid
Pele Island, located in the Shefa Province in Vanuatu
Pele (Aegean island), an island in the Aegean Sea off modern Turkey
Pele (Cos), a town of ancient Cos, Greece
Pele (Thessaly), a town of ancient Thessaly, Greece
Pele (volcano), an active volcano on Jupiter's moon Io

Other uses
 Pele (deity), the Fire Goddess, is the goddess of fire, lightning, wind and volcanoes and the creator of the Hawaiian Islands

See also
 Pelee (disambiguation)
 Pelle (disambiguation)
Boys for Pele, third album by American musician Tori Amos
 Pele's hair, a form of lava
 Peléan eruption, a type of volcanic eruption 
 Pele FC, an association football club from Guyana
Pelé's Soccer, a 1981 video game 
 Pele tower, small fortified keep along the English and Scottish Borders
 Pelé dos Santos, character in the film The Life Aquatic with Steve Zissou